TKB-059 (ТКБ-059) was a Soviet three-barrel bullpup assault rifle, capable of fully automatic fire, chambered for the 7.62×39mm round and manufactured by Tula Arms Plant in 1966. It was based on the Device 3B (Прибор 3Б), an earlier experimental assault rifle with three barrels. Both weapons were developed by the small arms designer Gennadij Korobov.

Both weapons used a triplet 7.62×39mm magazines with the option of 45 Round Magazines (15x3) or 60 Round Magazines (20x3), with each barrel independently fed from the magazine. The TKB-059 can be fired ambidextrously as the cartridge ejection is downwards behind the magazine area.

TKB-059 can now be seen at the Tula arms museum.

In popular culture
The weapon is featured in Payday 2 as the Rodion 3B Rifle.

See also
 80.002
 AO-46
 AO-63
 TKB-408
 TKB-517
 TKB-0146
 List of bullpup firearms
 List of assault rifles

References

External links
 Photo of Pribor 3B

7.62×39mm assault rifles
Bullpup rifles
Multiple-barrel firearms
Trial and research firearms of the Soviet Union
Assault rifles of the Soviet Union
Tula Arms Plant products